The House of Glücksburg is a collateral branch of the German House of Oldenburg. Its members have reigned at various times in Denmark, Norway, Sweden, Iceland, Greece, and several northern German states.

Current monarchs King Charles III of the United Kingdom, Queen Margrethe II of Denmark, and King Harald V of Norway, as well as former queens consort Anne-Marie of Greece and Sofía of Spain, are patrilineal members of cadet branches of the House of Glücksburg.

Etymology 
The House of Glücksburg is also spelled Glücksborg or Lyksborg. It is a shortened name stemming from House of Schleswig-Holstein-Sonderburg-Glücksburga collateral branch of the House of Oldenburg.

The family takes its name from Glücksburg, a town in Schleswig and the Holstein region.

History

Glücksburg is a small coastal town on the southern, German side of the fjord of Flensburg that divides Germany from Denmark. In 1460, Glücksburg came, as part of the conjoined Dano-German duchies of Schleswig and Holstein, to Count Christian of Oldenburg whom, in 1448, the Danes had elected their king as Christian I, the Norwegians likewise taking him as their hereditary king in 1450.

In 1564, Christian I's great-grandson, King Frederick II, in re-distributing Schleswig and Holstein's fiefs, retained some lands for his own senior royal line while allocating Glücksburg to his brother Duke John the Younger (1545–1622), along with Sønderborg, in appanage. John's heirs further sub-divided their share and created, among other branches, a line of Schleswig-Holstein-Sonderburg dukes at Beck (an estate near Minden bought by the family in 1605), who remained vassals of Denmark's kings.

By 1825, the castle of Glücksburg had returned to the Danish crown (from another ducal branch called Glücksburg, extinct in 1779) and was given that year by King Frederick VI, along with a new ducal title, to his kinsman Frederick of Schleswig-Holstein-Sonderburg-Beck. Frederick suffixed the territorial designation to the ducal title he already held, in lieu of "Beck" (an estate the family had, in fact, sold in 1745). Thus emerged the extant Dukes of Schleswig-Holstein-Sonderburg-Glücksburg.

The Danish line of Oldenburg kings died out in 1863, and the elder line of the Schleswig-Holstein family became extinct with the death of the last Augustenburg duke in 1931. Thereafter, the House of Glücksburg became the senior surviving line of the House of Oldenburg. Another cadet line of Oldenburgs, the Dukes of Holstein-Gottorp, consisted of two branches which held onto sovereignty into the 20th century. But members of the Romanov line were executed in or exiled from their Russian Empire in 1917, while the Grand Duchy of Oldenburg was abolished in 1918, although its dynastic line survives.

Neither the Dukes of Beck nor of Glücksburg had been sovereign rulers; they held their lands in fief from the ruling Dukes of Schleswig and Holstein, i.e. the Kings of Denmark and (until 1773) the Dukes of Holstein-Gottorp.

Prince Christian of Schleswig-Holstein-Sonderburg-Glücksburg, the fourth son of Duke Friedrich of Glücksburg, was recognized in the London Protocol of 1852 as successor to the childless King Frederick VII of Denmark. He became King of Denmark as Christian IX on 15 November 1863.

Prince Vilhelm, the second son of Crown Prince Christian and Crown Princess Luise, was elected King of the Hellenes on 30 March 1863, succeeding the ousted Wittelsbach Otto of Greece and reigning under the name George I.

Prince Carl, the second son of Frederick VIII of Denmark, Christian IX's eldest son, became King of Norway on 18 November 1905 as Haakon VII of Norway.

Christian IX's daughters, Alexandra and Dagmar (as Maria Feodorovna) became the consorts of, respectively, King Edward VII of the United Kingdom and Emperor Alexander III of Russia. As a result, by 1914 descendants of King Christian IX held the crowns of several European realms, and he became known as the "Father-in-law of Europe".

Christian IX's older brother inherited formal headship of the family as Karl, Duke of Schleswig-Holstein-Sonderburg-Glücksburg, followed by their brother Friedrich, Duke of Schleswig-Holstein-Sonderburg-Glücksburg. It is his descendants who now represent the senior line of the Schleswig-Holstein branch of the House of Oldenburg.

Patrilineal ancestry of Duke Friedrich Wilhelm 
 Elimar I, Count of Oldenburg
 Elimar II, Count of Oldenburg
 Christian I, Count of Oldenburg (Christian the Quarrelsome)
 Maurice, Count of Oldenburg
 Christian II, Count of Oldenburg
 John I, Count of Oldenburg
 Christian III, Count of Oldenburg
 John II, Count of Oldenburg
 Conrad I, Count of Oldenburg
 Christian V, Count of Oldenburg
 Dietrich, Count of Oldenburg
 Christian I of Denmark
 Frederick I of Denmark
 Christian III of Denmark
 John II, Duke of Schleswig-Holstein-Sonderburg
 Alexander, Duke of Schleswig-Holstein-Sonderburg
 August Philipp, Duke of Schleswig-Holstein-Sonderburg-Beck
 Frederick Louis, Duke of Schleswig-Holstein-Sonderburg-Beck
 Peter August, Duke of Schleswig-Holstein-Sonderburg-Beck
 Karl Anton August, Prince of Schleswig-Holstein-Sonderburg-Beck
 Friedrich Karl Ludwig, Duke of Schleswig-Holstein-Sonderburg-Beck
 Friedrich Wilhelm, Duke of Schleswig-Holstein-Sonderburg-Glücksburg

Schleswig-Holstein-Sonderburg-Glücksburg 

The Dukes of Schleswig-Holstein-Sonderburg-Glücksburg constitute the senior male line of the branch. They hold the headship by primogeniture of the cadet house of Glücksburg. The headship by agnatic primogeniture of the entire House of Oldenburg is held by Christoph, Prince of Schleswig-Holstein.

The heir apparent is Friedrich Ferdinand, Hereditary Prince of Schleswig-Holstein (born 1985).

Denmark 

In 1853, Prince Christian of Schleswig-Holstein-Sonderburg-Glücksburg became heir to the Kingdom of Denmark, and in 1863, he ascended the throne. He was the fourth son of Friedrich Wilhelm, Duke of Schleswig-Holstein-Sonderburg-Glücksburg, whose elder brother (and male-line descendants) retained the Glücksburg dukedom. The Danish royal family call itself Glücksborg, using a slightly Danicized form of Glücksburg.

The heir apparent is Frederik, Crown Prince of Denmark (born 1968), who belongs agnatically to the Monpezat family. See the present line of succession. Although there are no more male members of the dynastic line of Glücksburgs domiciled in Denmark, there are descendants of Christian IX who married without the monarch's permission, thus forfeiting their royal status.

Greece 

In 1863 and with the name George I, Prince Wilhelm of Denmark was elected King of the Hellenes on the recommendation of Europe's Great Powers. He was the second son of King Christian IX of Denmark.

The Hellenic constitutional monarchy was usurped in a coup d'état by a military junta in 1967 and the royal family fled into exile. The monarchy was abolished in 1973. After the collapse of the military dictatorship in 1974, 69.18% of votes recorded in a republic referendum were against the return of the monarchy.

Norway 

In 1905, Prince Carl of Denmark became Norway's first independent monarch in 518 years, taking the regnal name Haakon VII. His father was King Frederick VIII of Denmark, and one of his uncles was King George I of Greece.

The heir apparent is Crown Prince Haakon of Norway (born 1973). See the present line of succession.

Iceland 

In 1918, Iceland was elevated from an autonomous Danish province to a separate Kingdom of Iceland. Christian X of Denmark was henceforth King of Denmark and Iceland until 1944, when Iceland dissolved the personal union between the two countries.

The heir apparent was his son, Frederick IX of Denmark (1899–1972).

Line of succession
By agnatic primogeniture:
	
Frederick I of Denmark (1471–1533)
Christian III of Denmark (1503–1559)
John II, Duke of Schleswig-Holstein-Sonderburg (1545–1622)
Alexander, Duke of Schleswig-Holstein-Sonderburg (1573–1627)
August Philipp, Duke of Schleswig-Holstein-Sonderburg-Beck (1612–1675)
Frederick Louis, Duke of Schleswig-Holstein-Sonderburg-Beck (1653–1728)
Peter August, Duke of Schleswig-Holstein-Sonderburg-Beck (1697–1775)
Prince Karl Anton August of Schleswig-Holstein-Sonderburg-Beck (1727–1759)
Friedrich Karl Ludwig, Duke of Schleswig-Holstein-Sonderburg-Beck (1757–1816)
Friedrich Wilhelm, Duke of Schleswig-Holstein-Sonderburg-Glücksburg (1785–1831)
 Friedrich, Duke of Schleswig-Holstein-Sonderburg-Glücksburg (1814–1885)
 Friedrich Ferdinand, Duke of Schleswig-Holstein (1855–1934)
 Wilhelm Friedrich, Duke of Schleswig-Holstein (1891–1965)
 Peter, Duke of Schleswig-Holstein (1922–1980)
 Christoph, Prince of Schleswig-Holstein (born 1949)
 (1) Friedrich Ferdinand, Hereditary Prince of Schleswig-Holstein (b. 1985)
 (2) Prince Constantin of Schleswig-Holstein (b. 1986)
 (3) Prince Leopold of Schleswig-Holstein (b. 1991)
 (4) Prince Alexander of Schleswig-Holstein (b. 1953)
 (5) Prince Julian of Schleswig-Holstein (b. 1997)
 Christian IX of Denmark (1818–1906)
 Frederick VIII of Denmark (1843–1912)
 Christian X of Denmark (1870–1947)
 Knud, Hereditary Prince of Denmark (1900–1976)
 (6) Count Ingolf of Rosenborg (b. 1940)
 Haakon VII of Norway (1872–1957)
 Olav V of Norway (1903–1991)
 (7) Harald V of Norway (b. 1937)
 (8) Haakon, Crown Prince of Norway (b. 1973)
 (9) Prince Sverre Magnus of Norway (b. 2005)
 Prince Harald of Denmark (1876–1949)
 Count Oluf of Rosenborg (1923–1990)
 (10) Count Ulrik of Rosenborg (b. 1950)
 (11) Count Philip of Rosenborg (b. 1986)
 George I of Greece (1845–1913)
 Constantine I of Greece (1868–1923)
 Paul of Greece (1901–1964)
 Constantine II of Greece (1940–2023)
 (12) Pavlos, Crown Prince of Greece (b. 1967)
 (13) Prince Constantine Alexios of Greece and Denmark (b. 1998)
 (14) Prince Achileas Andreas of Greece and Denmark (b. 2000)
 (15) Prince Odysseas Kimon of Greece and Denmark (b. 2004)
 (16) Prince Aristide Stavros of Greece and Denmark (b. 2008)
 (17) Prince Nikolaos of Greece and Denmark (b. 1969)
 (18) Prince Philippos of Greece and Denmark (b. 1986)
 Prince Andrew of Greece and Denmark (1882–1944)
 Prince Philip, Duke of Edinburgh (1921–2021)
 (19)  Charles III of the United Kingdom (b. 1948)
 (20) William, Prince of Wales (b. 1982)
 (21) Prince George of Wales (b. 2013)
 (22) Prince Louis of Wales (b. 2018)
 (23) Prince Harry, Duke of Sussex (b. 1984)
 (24) Prince Archie of Sussex (b. 2019)
 (25) Prince Andrew, Duke of York (b. 1960)
 (26) Prince Edward, Duke of Edinburgh (b. 1964)
 (27) James Mountbatten-Windsor, Earl of Wessex (b. 2007)
 Prince Christopher of Greece and Denmark (1888–1940)
 (28) Prince Michael of Greece and Denmark (b. 1939)
 Prince Valdemar of Denmark (1858–1939)
 Prince Axel of Denmark (1888–1964)
 Count Flemming Valdemar of Rosenborg (1922–2002)
 (29) Count Axel of Rosenborg (b. 1950)
 (30) Count Carl Johan of Rosenborg (b. 1979)
 (31) Count Alexander Flemming of Rosenborg (b. 1993)
 (32) Count Birger of Rosenborg (b. 1950)
 (33) Count Carl Johan of Rosenborg (b. 1952)
 Prince Erik, Count of Rosenborg (1890–1950)
 Count Christian of Rosenborg (1932–1997)
 (34) Count Valdemar of Rosenborg (b. 1965)
 (35) Count Nicolai of Rosenborg (b. 1997)
 Adolf, Duke of Holstein-Gottorp (1526–1586)
 John Adolf, Duke of Holstein-Gottorp (1575–1616)
 Frederick III, Duke of Holstein-Gottorp (1597–1659)
 Christian Albert, Duke of Holstein-Gottorp (1641–1695)
 Frederick IV, Duke of Holstein-Gottorp (1671–1702)
 Charles Frederick, Duke of Holstein-Gottorp (1700–1739)
 Peter III of Russia (1728–1762)
 Paul I of Russia (1754–1801)
 Nicholas I of Russia (1796–1855)
 Alexander II of Russia (1818–1881)
 Grand Duke Paul Alexandrovich of Russia (1860–1919)
 Grand Duke Dmitri Pavlovich of Russia (1891–1941)
 Prince Paul Dimitrievich Romanovsky-Ilyinsky (1928–2004)
 (36) Prince Dimitri Pavlovich Romanovsky-Ilyinsky (b. 1954)
 (37) Prince Michael Pavlovich Romanovsky-Ilyinsky (b. 1961)
 Prince George Alexandrovich Yurievsky (1872–1913)
 Prince Alexander Georgijevich Yurievsky (1900–1988)
 (38) Prince George Alexandrovich Yurievsky (b. 1961)
 Grand Duke Michael Nicolaevich of Russia (1832–1909)
 Grand Duke Alexander Mikhailovich of Russia (1866–1933)
 Prince Andrei Alexandrovich of Russia (1897–1981)
 Andrew Andreevich, Prince of Russia (1923–2021)
 (39) Alexis Andreevich, Prince of Russia (b. 1953)
 (40) Prince Peter Andreevich of Russia (b. 1961)
 (41) Prince Andrew Andreevich of Russia (b. 1963)
 Prince Rostislav Alexandrovich of Russia (1902–1978)
 Prince Rostislav Rostislavovich of Russia (1938–1999)
 (42) Prince Rostislav Rostislavovich of Russia (b. 1985)
 (43) Prince Rostislav Rostislavovich of Russia (b. 2013)
 (44) Prince Nikita Rostislavovich of Russia (b. 1987)
 Prince Nicholas Rostislavovich of Russia (1945–2000)
 (45) Prince Nicholas Nicolaevich of Russia (b. 1968)
 (46) Prince Daniel Nicolaevich of Russia (b. 1972)
 Prince Christian August of Holstein-Gottorp (1673–1726)
 Prince Georg Ludwig of Holstein-Gottorp (1719–1763)
 Peter I, Grand Duke of Oldenburg (1755–1829)
 Augustus, Grand Duke of Oldenburg (1783–1853)
 Peter II, Grand Duke of Oldenburg (1827–1900)
 Frederick Augustus II, Grand Duke of Oldenburg (1852–1931)
 Nikolaus, Hereditary Grand Duke of Oldenburg (1897–1970)
 Anton-Günther, Duke of Oldenburg (1923–2014)
 (47) Christian, Duke of Oldenburg (b. 1955) (48) Duke Alexander of Oldenburg (b. 1990)
 (49) Duke Philipp of Oldenburg (b. 1991)
 (50) Duke Anton Friedrich of Oldenburg (b. 1993)
 Duke Peter of Oldenburg (1926–2016) (51) Duke Friedrich August of Oldenburg (b. 1952)
 (52) Duke Nikolaus of Oldenburg (b. 1955)
 (53) Duke Christoph of Oldenburg (b. 1985)
 (54) Duke Georg of Oldenburg (b. 1990)
 (55) Duke Oscar of Oldenburg (b. 1991)
 (56) Duke Georg Moritz of Oldenburg (b. 1957)
 Duke Friedrich August of Oldenburg (1936–2017)''
 (57) Duke Paul-Wladimir of Oldenburg (b. 1969)
 (58) Duke Kirill of Oldenburg (b. 2002)
 (59) Duke Carlos of Oldenburg (b. 2004)
 (60) Duke Paul of Oldenburg (b. 2005)
 (61) Duke Huno of Oldenburg (b. 1940)
 (62) Duke Johann of Oldenburg (b. 1940)
 (63) Duke Konstantin Nikolaus of Oldenburg (b. 1975)

References

External links 
 Castle of Glücksburg
 Royal House of Denmark
 Royal House of Norway

|-

|-

|-

|-

 
German noble families